The Upper Wardha Dam is an earthfill straight gravity dam across the Wardha River, a tributary of the Godavari River, near Simbhora village in Morshi taluk in Amravati district in the Indian state of Maharashtra. The dam provides multipurpose benefits of irrigation, drinking water supply, flood control and hydropower generation.

The Upper Wardha Dam is also known as the Nala Damayanti Sagar, named after the famous characters Nala and Damayanti of an epic love story in Hindu mythology, Nala and Damayanti.

The multipurpose Upper Wardha Dam project is considered the lifeline for Amravati city, and Morshi and Warud Talukas. It is an integral component of the Upper Wardha Irrigation Project, which envisages providing water for irrigation, drinking water supply and for industrial use and also flood control. Hydropower generation is planned only when irrigation develops.

Geography
The Wardha River, across which the Upper Wardha Dam is built, is a tributary of the Godavari River. It flows along the entire northern and western border of the Wardha district. After traversing , it joins Wainganga River and together it is called the Pranhita, which ultimately flows into the Godavari River. Kar, Wena, Jam and  Erai are its left-bank tributaries whereas Madu, Bembla and Penganga are the right-bank tributaries. The catchment area is hilly and forested in its upper reaches from its source and the lower reaches are flat wide valleys.

The river drains a catchment area of  up to the dam site.

Hydrology
The path of Monsoon depressions that originate in the Bay of Bengal descends directly on the Upper Wardha catchment area. In the months of August and September, intense cyclonic precipitation also occurs over the catchment for one of two days as the low-pressure area formed in the Bay of Bengal and the cyclone moved in North West direction. On such occasions, intense rainfall is followed by flash flood runoff in the catchment. In view of these meteorological aspects heavy floods have been very common feature in this catchment. For such a flashy type of catchment with varying  topography, runoff estimates at dam site are an involved process. The parameters of slope, soil and vegetation cover, which influence the hydrology of the project, vary widely. The average annual inflow to the Upper Wardha Reservoir is estimated at 783 million cubic metres. The 75% dependable runoff is estimated as 500,720,000 cubic metres.

Specifications

Upper Wardha dam has two sections, the spillway at the central part of the river is flanked by long earthen embankment dams. The dam structure has a volume content of 6500 million cubic metres. The gross storage capacity of the reservoir is 786,480,000 cubic metres (27.8 TMC) with the live or effective storage capacity fixed at 614.79 million cubic metres (21.7TMC). The Dead Storage capacity is 171,690,000 cubic metres. Water utilization is planned at 390 million cubic metres.

Submergence
The reservoir submergence involved 24 villages in Amravati and Wardha Districts, which were partially or fully submerged involving rehabilitation of 3000 families (11,817 people) of farmers and fish workers who were displaced and resettled. These families were still in an agitation mode seeking better compensation, as only a small cash compensation was provided to them when resettled. Their demand centred on right to access the Upper Wardha dam (the Nal Damayanti Sagar) reservoir for fisheries as a measure of rehabilitation.

Irrigation benefits
The command area is principally made up of Black Cotton Soils. Jowar, cotton, soybean, tur, ground nut, and oranges are the major crops grown in the command area. The canal systems are slated for completion by June 2013. To ensure better irrigation planning to ensure supplies reach the tail end of the canal system even during the low flow years, a "General Algorithm" model to operate the reservoir with a Rule Curve (reservoir operating rules) in real time with inputs of all variable parameters (such as monthly demands for irrigation) has been developed. The model results indicate that irrigation releases matched irrigation demand. The reservoir operation in this process is aimed by maintaining minimum storage at the beginning of monsoon (which is the end of water year) and maintaining maximum storage during the peak of the monsoon period.
However, due to the heavy sediment inflow the reservoir is losing its active storage capacity.

Water supply
Amravati town is now provided water supply from the Upeer Wardha reservoir supplementing an earlier supply source.. The plan envisages supplementation from the storage at the dam to meet the needs of the projected population of 34,500 in 2011 and 34500 in 2026 at 4,209,000 litres per day and 4,974,000 litres per day, respectively. Water for industrial use has also been allocated and based on this allotment, a 25,000,000 litre per day water treatment plant has been built near Amravati town. Another project to divert 4,230,000 cubic metres of water from the Upper Wardha Dam Pandhurna district in Madhya Pradesh has also been approved at a cost of US $18 million.

Flood control
The reservoir water level is regulated in such a way that the river flooding in the districts of Amravati and Wardha is avoided. An automatic system of operating gates of the spillway dam to release flood water safely downstream has been installed in a control chamber of the dam. The digital instrument installed (based on Genetic Algorithm) is a two-part ultrasonic gauging device. This system is linked to the management system through "RS-232 digital connection" to receive continuous gauge measurement data and concurrently converting the gauge level to volume figures.
 
Other benefits
The dam and its surroundings provide are picturesque. Several rare species of birds have been reported from the area.

See also

 Dams in Maharashtra
 List of reservoirs and dams in India

References

Dams in Amravati district
Gravity dams
Dams completed in 1993
1993 establishments in Maharashtra